Pernia Qureshi is a Pakistani stylist, fashion entrepreneur and classical dancer. She is married to Sahil Gilani.

Life and career

From a young age she trained as a Kuchipudi dancer, under the dance couple Raja-Radha Reddy. She has performed across India, with performances of Sufi music by Abida Parveen, and dance transliteration of the Urdu poems of Minu Bakshi.

Pernia has worked as a stylist for Harper's Bazaar, Elle and Conde Nast; and designed costumes for the Bollywood film Aisha.

Pernia played a courtesan in Muzaffar Ali's drama film set in pre-independence India, Jaanisaar, opposite Imran Abbas Naqvi. The movie was released on 7 August 2015.

Personal life 
In 2011, Qureshi married Arjun Prasad, a London-based accountant. The couple divorced in 2012. In 2019 she married Sahil Gilani. Pernia Qureshi is a US citizen.

Ecommerce platform 
She launched an e-commerce website, Pernia's Pop-Up Shop, in 2012. The site offers India's premier designers to a global clientele. Pernia's Pop-Up Shop was acquired by Purple Style Labs in 2019.

Filmography 
 Jaanisaar (2015)

References

External links

 

Harper's Bazaar
Indian costume designers
People from New Delhi
Living people
Indian women fashion designers
Year of birth missing (living people)